The Halloween Tree is a 1972 fantasy novel by American author Ray Bradbury, which traces the history of Samhain and Halloween.

Plot summary
A group of eight boys set out to go trick-or-treating on Halloween, only to discover that a ninth friend, Pipkin, has been whisked away on a journey that could determine whether he lives or dies. Through the help of a mysterious character named Carapace Clavicle Moundshroud, they pursue their friend across time and space through Ancient Egyptian, Ancient Greek, and Ancient Roman cultures, Celtic Druidism, the Notre Dame Cathedral in Medieval Paris, and The Day of the Dead in Mexico. Along the way, they learn the origins of the holiday that they celebrate, and the role that the fear of death, ghosts, and the haunts has played in shaping civilization. The Halloween Tree itself, with its many branches laden with jack-o'-lanterns, serves as a metaphor for the historical confluence of these traditions.

Background
The novel originated in 1967 as the screenplay for an unproduced collaboration with animator Chuck Jones. Bradbury later wrote and narrated Hanna-Barbera's 1993 feature-length animated version of the novel for television, for which he won an Emmy Award. A longer 2005 limited-edition "author's preferred text" of the novel was compiled and edited by Donn Albright. This edition also included both the 1967 and 1992 screenplays.

Bradbury dedicated The Halloween Tree to Man'ha Garreau-Dombasle (1898–1999), a French writer and translator who was the maternal grandmother of the actress and singer Arielle Dombasle and the wife of Maurice Garreau-Dombasle, a French ambassador to Mexico.

Illustrations
The Halloween Tree is illustrated by Joe Mugnaini, one of Bradbury's many collaborators over the years. Mugnaini illustrated many novels with Bradbury, and Bradbury owned many examples of Mugnaini's artwork.

Adaptations
 Bradbury wrote the script based upon the book. His script for The Halloween Tree won the 1994 Emmy Award for Outstanding Writing in an Animated Program.
 A film adaptation of the book is in development at Warner Bros. with Will Dunn screenwriting and Charlie Morrison overseeing the project.

Disneyland
On October 31, 2007, Bradbury attended the presentation of a Halloween Tree at Disneyland in California, to be included as part of its annual park-wide Halloween decorations every year.

References

External links
 

1972 American novels
American fantasy novels
Novels by Ray Bradbury
Halloween novels
Alfred A. Knopf books
Novels about time travel
American novels adapted into films
American novels adapted into television shows